Sule Tankarkar is a Local Government Area in the north of Jigawa State, Nigeria, bordering on the Republic of Niger. Its headquarters is in the town of Sule Tankarkar.
 
It has an area of 1,283 km2 and a population of 130,849 at the 2006 census.

The postal code of the area is 732.

References

Local Government Areas in Jigawa State